Nariampara Puthiyakavu Devikshethram is a Hindu temple located in Nariampara near Kattappana in Idukki district of Kerala state, India.

History
Puthiyakavil Devi Temple is a family temple of Kalloorath family. This temple is co-related to Moothedathu Devi Temple at Vaikom. The story behind the co-relation is that the grandfather of Gowri Kuttapan (eldest member Kalloorath family) was a staunch believer of Moothedathu Devi. He was also the velichappadu of Moothedathu Devi Temple. The following generation did not take the position of  Velichapaadu, so after the Grandfather's death, Gowri Kuttapan inherited his sword.

After her marriage with Kuttapan, Gowri settled at Kattappana. During this period Gowri Kuttapan used to light a lamp to venerate the Sword. They faced problems such as disease and poverty. Late Kuttapan conducted a Devaprasanam (astrological verification). In Devaprasanam the presence of Devi was visualised, and Devi needed shelter outside the house. So in the early 20th century, Late Kuttapan built a small building, but wished to build a proper temple.

In 1989, the Kalloorath family, headed by K.K. Thankapan, built a new temple. Family members involved the public in administering the temple, selecting 51 neighbours as the governing body.

Festivals
Kumbha Bharani Mahotsavam hosted during February and March is the most noted festival of the temple.

External links
Official website
Tourist Map of Idukki District

Hindu temples in Idukki district
Devi temples in Kerala